Apoorva Sahodarigal is a 1983 Indian Tamil-language film directed by R. Thyagarajan. The film stars Karthik, Suresh, Radha, Suhasini and Urvashi .

The film's music score has been done by Bollywood music director Bappi Lahiri.

Cast 
Karthik
Radha
Jaishankar
K. R. Vijaya
Vijaykumar 
Suresh
Suhasini
Urvashi 
Thengai Srinivasan

Soundtrack
Soundtrack was composed by Bappi Lahiri.
"Ennai Yaarum" - SPB, S. Janaki
"Annai Ennum" - S. Janaki
"Nallathukku" - SPB, S. Janaki
"Ondru Endral" - SPB, S. Janaki
"My Name is Rosy" - SPB, S. Janaki
"Engenge Nee Thaan" - SPB, S. Janaki

References

External links
 

1983 films
1980s Tamil-language films
Films scored by Bappi Lahiri
Films directed by R. Thyagarajan (director)